Chandos Hoskyns may refer to:

 Chandos Wren-Hoskyns (1812–1876), English landowner, agriculturist, politician and author
 Chandos Hoskyns (British Army officer) (1895–1940), British Army soldier